Phomopsis asparagi is a fungal plant pathogen that causes phomopsis blight in asparagus.

References

External links
 Index Fungorum
 USDA ARS Fungal Database

Fungal plant pathogens and diseases
Stem vegetable diseases
asparagi